Trevor Brazile (born November 16, 1976) is an American rodeo champion who competes in the Professional Rodeo Cowboys Association (PRCA). He holds the record for the most PRCA world championship titles with 26. He won his 26th title in 2020. He also holds the record for the most all-around cowboy world champion titles at 14, breaking the record of 7 titles held by Ty Murray; Murray's last earned was in 1998.

In 2010, Brazile won his 8th all-around title, surpassing Murray's seven titles from 1998. Murray's titles were won all in roughstock events, as opposed to Brazile's timed-event wins, and he is still the youngest winner of the title.

Brazile won the all-around world championship in 2002, 2003, 2004 and 2006 through 2015, and in 2018. He won the tie-down roping world championship in 2007, 2009 and 2010. He won the team roping world championship in 2010. He won the steer roping world championship in 2006, 2007, 2011, 2013, 2014, 2015, 2019 and 2020. He won four National Finals Steer Roping (NFSR) Average titles in 2012, 2014, 2015, and 2020. He also won two National Finals Rodeo (NFR) Average titles. One was in team roping in 2008 and one was in tie-down roping in 2010.

The late Jim Shoulders set the record of 16 world championships in 1959 when he won his 15th and 16th titles. Steer roper Guy Allen matched the record in 2001 after winning his 16th steer roping title. Two years later in 2003, he broke Shoulder's record after winning a 17th title. Allen won his 18th and final record to date in 2004. In 2013, Brazile won another all-around title and his total number of world titles moved to 19. This broke Allen's record of 18 world titles. As of 2020, Brazile has 26 world titles, eight more than Allen, who is in second place with 18 titles, and Shoulders is in third place with 16 titles.

In 2008, Brazile became the first PRCA cowboy to cross the $3 million mark in career earnings.

Brazile announced his retirement from full-time rodeo at the end of the 2018 NFR.

Brazile was born in Amarillo, Texas, and says that "he wants to be remembered as a great cowboy".

Brazile has been married since 2001 to Shada Cooper, the daughter of ProRodeo Hall of Fame cowboy, Roy Cooper, who mentored Brazile early in his rodeo career. They live in Decatur, Texas, with their three children.

Career highlights

2019
This season Brazile was on a reduced schedule as per his announcement at the end of the previous year's season. It did not stop him from winning the steer roping event this year and his 25th gold buckle. Brazile placed in all ten rounds of the PRCA National Finals Steer Roping (NFSR) in Mulvane, Kansas, and he was the only cowboy who did. He earned $56,707 at the NFSR. Part of that check was $27,347 for winning the NFSR Average title, making a 10-run time of 131.0 seconds. He won the championship with total earnings of $129,834. His total earnings at the NFSR was $60,989, which was the most of all the competitors.

2015
 2015 NFR All-Around Cowboy Champion
 1st place Tie Down Roping Round 1 NFR with a time of 6.8 seconds
 1st place Tie Down Roping Round 8 NFR with a time of 6.5 seconds.  Ties arena record set by Cody Ohl

2010
All-Around titles
 National Western Stock Show & Rodeo (Denver)
 Fort Worth (Texas) Stock Show & Rodeo
 Clark County Fair & Rodeo (Logandale, Nev.)
 Oakdale (Calif.) Saddle Club Rodeo
 Angelina County Benefit Rodeo (Lufkin, Texas)
 Walker County Fair & Rodeo (Huntsville, Texas)
 Fort Bend County Fair and Rodeo (Rosenberg, Texas)
 Butterfield Stage Days (Bridgeport, Texas)

Tie-Down Roping titles
 National Western Stock Show & Rodeo (Denver)
 San Antonio (Texas) Stock Show & Rodeo
 Won the Guymon (Okla.) Pioneer Days Rodeo
 Oakdale (Calif.) Saddle Club Rodeo
 Angelina County Benefit Rodeo (Lufkin, Texas)

Team Roping titles — partner Patrick Smith
 Clark County Fair & Rodeo (Logandale, Nev.)
 Oakdale (Calif.) Saddle Club Rodeo

Steer Roping titles
 Fort Bend County Fair and Rodeo (Rosenberg, Texas)\
 Butterfield Stage Days (Bridgeport, Texas)

2009
2009 Highlights
He tied for first place in Round 5 of the tie-down roping with a time of 7.1 seconds and placed in three other rounds en route to clinching his second world championship in that event in three years and a record-tying seventy all-around gold buckle; placed in one round of the team roping with Patrick Smith. By earning his 11th world championship, Brazile moved into a tie for third place on the career list with Dean Oliver and Charmayne James."

All-around titles
 San Angelo (Texas) Stock Show & Rodeo;
 World's Oldest Rodeo (Prescott, Ariz.);
 Ellensburg (Wash.) Rodeo;
 Cody (Wyo.) Stampede
 Dodge City (Kan.) Roundup
 Lea County Fair & PRCA Rodeo (Lovington, N.M.)
 Sikeston (Mo.) Jaycee Bootheel Rodeo
 Farm-City Pro Rodeo (Hermiston, Ore.)
 Caldwell (Idaho) Night Rodeo
 Canby (Ore.) Rodeo
 Lawton (Okla.) Rangers Rodeo
 Kansas' Biggest Rodeo (Phillipsburg, Kan.)
 Wild Bill Hickok Rodeo (Abilene, Kan.)
 Deadwood (S.D.) Days of '76 Rodeo
 Ogden (Utah) Pioneer Days Rodeo
 Walker County Fair (Huntsville, Texas)
 Colorado State Fair & Rodeo (Pueblo, Colo.)
 Fort Bend County Fair & Rodeo (Rosenberg, Texas)
 Bell County PRCA Rodeo (Belton, Texas)
 Rodeo de Santa Fe (N.M.)
 Livermore (Calif.) Rodeo
 Southwestern International PRCA Rodeo (El Paso, Texas)
 Wild Wild West Pro Rodeo (Silver City, N.M.)
 Eastland County ProRodeo (Ranger, Texas)
 Cowboy Capital of the World Pro Rodeo (Stephenville, Texas)
 Will Rogers Stampede (Claremore, Okla.)

Tie-down roping titles
 Justin Boots Championships (Omaha, Neb.)
 Clark County Fair & Rodeo (Logandale, Nev.)
 Snake River Stampede (Nampa, Idaho)
 Farm-City Pro Rodeo (Hermiston, Ore.)
 Caldwell (Idaho) Night Rodeo
 Molalla (Ore.) Buckeroo Rodeo
 Kansas' Biggest Rodeo (Phillipsburg, Kan.)
 Guy Weadick Memorial Rodeo (High River, Alberta)
 Bell County PRCA Rodeo (Belton, Texas)
 Wild Wild West Pro Rodeo (Silver City, N.M.)
 Butterfield Stage Days Rodeo (Bridgeport, Texas)
 Kitsap County Fair & Stampede (Bremerton, Wash.)
 Eastland County ProRodeo (Ranger, Texas)
 Magic Valley Stampede (Filer, Idaho)

Team roping titles (with Patrick Smith)
 Greeley (Colo.)
 Independence Stampede
 Dodge City (Kan.) Roundup
 Ogden (Utah) Pioneer Days Rodeo
 Wild Wild West Pro Rodeo (Silver City, N.M.)
 Daines Ranch Rodeo (Innisfail, Alberta)
 Cowboy Capital of the World Pro Rodeo (Stephenville, Texas)

Co-champion
 Pioneer Days Rodeo (Clovis, N.M.)

Steer roping titles
 Heartland ProRodeo Steer Roping Championships (Waco, Texas)
 Matagorda Fair & Rodeo (Bay City, Texas)
 Wild Wild West Pro Rodeo (Silver City, N.M.)
 Will Rogers Stampede (Claremore, Okla.)
 Kitsap County Fair & Stampede (Bremerton, Wash.)
 Lewiston (Idaho) Roundup

2008
He became the first PRCA cowboy to cross the $3 million mark in career earnings.
All-Around Titles
 Caldwell (Idaho) Night Rodeo (first round Ariat Playoffs)
 Grand National Rodeo (San Francisco)
 Star of Texas Fair & Rodeo (Austin)
 SandHills Stock Show & Rodeo (Odessa, Texas)
 Guymon (Okla.) Pioneer Days Rodeo
 Redding (Calif.) Rodeo
 St. Paul (Ore.) Rodeo
 Deadwood (S.D.) Days of '76 Rodeo
 Will Rogers Stampede (Claremore, Okla.)
 Glen Rose (Texas) PRCA Rodeo
 YMBL Championship Rodeo (Beaumont, Texas)
 Lonestar Stampede (Conroe, Texas)
 Canby (Ore.) Rodeo
 Beef Empire Days PRCA Rodeo (Garden City, Kan.)
 Molalla (Ore.) Buckeroo
 Cowboy Capital of the World Pro Rodeo (Stephenville, Texas)
 Lea County Fair & Rodeo (Lovington, N.M.)
 Lawton (Okla.) Rangers Rodeo
 Horse Heaven Round-Up (Kennewick, Wash.)
 Rancho Mission Viejo Rodeo (San Juan Capistrano, Calif.)
 Black Gold Pro Rodeo (Andrews, Texas)

Tie-Down Roping Titles
 Caldwell (Idaho) Night Rodeo (first round Ariat Playoffs)
 Walker County Fair & Rodeo, Huntsville, Texas
 La Fiesta de los Vaqueros, Tucson, Ariz.
 Co-champion YMBL Championship Rodeo (Beaumont, Texas)
 Redding (Calif.) Rodeo
 World's Oldest Rodeo Prescott (Ariz.) Frontier Days
 St. Paul (Ore.) Rodeo
 Livingston (Mont.) Round-up

Team Roping Titles — with partner Patrick Smith
 Deadwood (S.D.) Days of '76 Rodeo
 Will Rogers Stampede (Claremore, Okla.)
 Horse Heaven Round-Up (Kennewick, Wash.)
 Rancho Mission Viejo Rodeo (San Juan Capistrano, Calif.)
 Glen Rose (Texas) PRCA Rodeo
 YMBL Championship Rodeo (Beaumont, Texas)

Steer Roping Titles
 Deadwood (S.D.) Days of '76 Rodeo
 Inter-State Rodeo (Coffeyville, Kan.)
 Butterfield Stage Days Rodeo (Bridgeport, Texas)
 Cowboy Capital of the World Pro Rodeo (Stephenville, Texas)

2007
Became first Triple Crown winner in 24 years and just the 10th in history by winning the all-around, tie-down roping and steer roping gold buckles. Broke his own single-season record with earnings of $425,115 and moved from seventh to third on the career earnings list

All-Around Titles
 Wrangler National Finals Rodeo, Las Vegas
 Walker County Fair & Rodeo
 Grand National Rodeo
 Pioneer Days Rodeo
 West of the Pecos Rodeo
 Snake River Stampede
 Deadwood Days of '76 Rodeo
 Sonora Outlaw Pro Rodeo
 New Mexico State Fair Rodeo
 Amarillo Tri-State Fair Rodeo
 Dodge Texas Circuit Finals Rodeo
 With partner Patrick Smith won the team roping in Rounds 4 and 5 of Wrangler National Finals Rodeo
 Rodeo Killeen
 Ogden Pioneer Days Rodeo
 Deadwood Days of '76 Rodeo
 Sikeston Jaycee Bootheel Rodeo

Co-Champion
 Pioneer Days Rodeo
 Sonora Outlaw Pro Rodeo

Tie-Down Roping Titles
 Round 7 of the Wrangler National Finals Rodeo, Las Vegas, in a rodeo-best time of 6.7 seconds
 La Fiesta de los Vaqueros
 Grand National Rodeo
 Clovis Rodeo
 Pioneer Days Rodeo
 Snake River Stampede
 Lawton Rangers Rodeo

Steer Roping Titles
 San Angelo Stock Show & Rodeo
 Coleman PRCA Rodeo
 Jawhawker Roundup

2006
Won the most money during the Fourth of July week for the 2006 season with $24,894 and became the youngest PRCA cowboy and the seventh overall to cross the $2 million mark in career earnings.

All-Around Titles
 Lewiston Roundup
 Colorado State Fair & Rodeo
 Ellensburg Rodeo
 Lea County Fair & Rodeo
 Deadwood Days of '76 Rodeo
 World's Oldest Rodeo
 West of the Pecos Rodeo
 Parker County Frontier Days Pro Rodeo
 Beef Empire Days PRCA Rodeo
 Will Rogers Stampede
 Clark County Fair & Rodeo
 Laughlin River Stampede

Team Roping Titles (with partner Rich Skelton)
 Fort Bend County Fair & Rodeo
 Lewiston Roundup
 Moses Lake Roundup
 Days of '47 Rodeo
 Beef Empire Days PRCA Rodeo
 Clark County Fair & Rodeo

Co-Champion
 Canby Rodeo
 Red Bluff Round-Up

Tie-Down Roping Titles 
 Lewiston Roundup
 Colorado State Fair & Rodeo
 Horse Heaven Roundup
 Fourth of July Youth Celebration and PRCA Pro Rodeo
 West of the Texas Rodeo
 Clark County Fair & Rodeo
 Walker County Fair & Rodeo
 Rodeo Austin
 RodeoHouston
 La Fiesta de los Vaqueros
 Also won the Wrangler ProRodeo Tour Round and average titles at the Ellensburg Rodeo.
 Won first single-event world title after earning $87,090 and claiming first steer roping world title.

Steer Roping Average Titles
 Southern Oklahoma Stampede PRCA Rodeo
 Amarillo Tri-State Fair Pro Rodeo
 Lewiston Roundup
 Wyoming State Fair and Rodeo
 West of the Pecos Rodeo
 Parker County Frontier Days Pro Rodeo
 Northeast Texas Stampede PRCA Rodeo

Co-Champion
 Bell County Youth Fair and Livestock Show and PRCA Rodeo

Honors 
 2002 Rodeo Hall of Fame of the National Cowboy and Western Heritage Museum
 2008 Texas Cowboy Hall of Fame
 2012 Texas Trail of Fame
 2012 Ellensburg Rodeo Hall of Fame
 2016 Texas Sports Hall of Fame
 2018 Cheyenne Frontier Days Hall of Fame
 2018 PBR Ty Murray Top Hand Award
 2019 Pendleton Round-Up and Happy Canyon Hall of Fame
 2022 ProRodeo Hall of Fame

References

External links
 An interview with Trevor Brazile
 LEGEND: Horsemanship from Trevor Brazile and Patrick Smith

1976 births
Living people
All-Around
Roping (rodeo)
Sportspeople from Amarillo, Texas
People from Decatur, Texas
People from Midland, Texas
Professional Bull Riders: Heroes and Legends